Paolo Nedes (born 27 March 2003) is a Ukrainian professional footballer of Italian descent who plays as a centre-back for Ukrainian club Mariupol.

References

External links
 Profile on Mariupol official website
 
 

2003 births
Living people
Place of birth missing (living people)
Ukrainian footballers
Ukrainian people of Italian descent
Association football defenders
FC Shakhtar Donetsk players
FC Mariupol players
Ukrainian Premier League players